Cezar Augusto Hermenegildo (born March 13, 1986 in Monte Azul Paulista), commonly known as Cezar Augusto, is a Brazilian former professional footballer who played as a forward. He is Yangon United's and Myanmar National League's all-time highest goalscorer with 118 Goals.

Career
On 30 September 2015 Cezar Augusto scored his 100th MNL goal in a 2-0 win over Kanbawza, becoming the first player to reach this statistic.

On 24 November 2015, Cezar Augusto signed a two-year contract with Bosnian Premijer liga side FK Sarajevo, before having his contract terminated by mutual consent on 23 March 2017.

On 11 May 2017, Cezar Augusto re-signed for Yangon United on a contract until the end of the 2017 season.

Career statistics

Honours

Team
Atlético Mineiro
Série B (1): 2006
Yangon United
Myanmar National League (3): 2012, 2013, 2015

Individual 
 Myanmar National League Top Scorer: 2013, 2014, 2015

References

External links

1986 births
Living people
Brazilian footballers
Botafogo de Futebol e Regatas players
Clube Atlético Mineiro players
Santa Cruz Futebol Clube players
Clube de Regatas Brasil players
Yangon United F.C. players
Expatriate footballers in Myanmar
Brazilian expatriate sportspeople in Myanmar
Footballers from São Paulo (state)
Association football forwards